A Lion Returns is a 2020 Australian drama film directed by Serhat Caradee, starring Tyler De Nawi, Danny Elacci, Jacqui Purvis, Taffy Hany, Buddy Dannoun, Helen Chebatte and Maha Wilson.

Cast
 Tyler De Nawi as Jamal Alamein
 Danny Elacci as Omar Alamein
 Jacqui Purvis as Heidi Alamein
 Taffy Hany as Yusef Alamein
 Buddy Dannoun as Yahya Alamein
 Helen Chebatte as Manal Alamein
 Maha Wilson as Maya Alamein
 Maddox Elachi as Khalil Alamein
 Mohammad Mick Farroukh as Hesham
 Oliver Trajkovski as Mahmood
 Serhat Caradee as Ahmed
 Frances Duca as Auntie Fadia

Release
The film premiered at the Gold Coast Film Festival on 22 April 2020. The film opened in theatres in Australia on 5 November.

Reception
Erin Free of FilmInk called the film a "volatile, extraordinarily well-crafted treatise on the dangers of extremism, and how the bonds with the ones that you love can bring it undone", a "mini-miracle of local filmmaking" and an "excellent piece of cinema outside of its incredible production history." Free also praised the performances, calling them "uniformly excellent", and wrote that Caradee "displays a resolute command of his material from beginning to end".

Sandra Hall of The Sydney Morning Herald rated the film 4 stars out of 5 and wrote that while the script is "probably too verbose" and largely "predictable", the film's story is "told with such conviction" and the actors "pack" their dialogue with "such a charge that there’s a wealth of family history in every word."

References

External links
 
 

Australian drama films
2020 drama films